The Voice Senior is a version of The Voice TV series franchise in which seniors participate.

Versions
The first such variation was The Voice Senior from the Netherlands, which was followed by other international variants:

 Franchise with a currently airing season
 Franchise with an upcoming season
 Franchise with an unknown status
 Franchise that had ceased to air
 Original version of The Voice Senior

See also
 The Voice (franchise)
 List of The Voice Kids TV series

References

External links
 Talpa Media's Official website
 The Voice Senior on Talpa